Peter Grant (1714?–1824), known as Auld Dubrach, was the last known survivor of the Jacobite rising of 1745. According to folklore he was introduced to King George IV in 1822 during his visit to Edinburgh as "His Majesty's oldest enemy".
However, this story is probably not true.

A portrait of him resides in the Scottish National Portrait Gallery.

References

Reference bibliography

Further reading 
 
 

Jacobite military personnel of the Jacobite rising of 1745
1714 births
1824 deaths
Jacobites
Place of birth missing
18th-century Scottish people
19th-century Scottish people
Longevity claims